Lauma Grīva (born 27 October 1984) was a Latvian athlete who competed in the long jump.

At the 2010 European Championships she achieved a new personal best of 6.60 metres, but was two centimetres short of qualifying for the final. She finished 15th.

Lauma is also the 2009 Latvian champion in long jump.

Her sister Māra Grīva is also a long jumper.

Lauma attended the Ventspils Gymnasium No.1 and the Latvian Academy of Sport Education.

Achievements

References

External links

 

1984 births
Living people
Latvian female long jumpers
Athletes (track and field) at the 2012 Summer Olympics
Olympic athletes of Latvia
People from Ventspils
European Games competitors for Latvia
Athletes (track and field) at the 2019 European Games